Maya Goshen (born 25 June 2000) is an Israeli judoka who competes for the Israel national judo team.

At the 2022 World Judo Championships Mixed team event Goshen won the final match for the Israel national judo team, winning them the bronze medal. Her win and subsequent reaction to the injury sustained by her Dutch opponent Sanne Vermeer, was applauded in media.

As a child, Goshen practiced Floor gymnastics before transitioning to Judo.

See also
List of Jews in sports
Israel Judo Association
Israel national judo team

References

External links
 
 

2000 births
Living people
Israeli female judoka
Israeli female athletes
Israeli martial artists
Israeli sportspeople
21st-century Israeli women
Israeli Jews
Jewish martial artists
Jewish Israeli sportspeople